Endeavor Group Holdings, Inc. (formerly known as William Morris Endeavor and WME-IMG) is an American holding company for talent and media agencies with its primary offices in Beverly Hills, California, United States. The company was founded in April 2009 after the merger of the William Morris Agency and the original Endeavor Talent Agency. Endeavor represents artists in film, television, music, theater, digital media, and publishing. It also represents the NFL and NHL. Endeavor owns the Ultimate Fighting Championship. It is headed by CEO Ari Emanuel and executive chairman Patrick Whitesell.

The group owns a 20% stake in film and television production company Fifth Season (formerly Endeavor Content), with the remaining 80% owned by South Korean entertainment and retail company CJ ENM.

History

Beginnings

The Endeavor Talent Agency launched in 1995. By 2009, it was one of the fastest-growing Hollywood talent agencies, with The New York Times singling out its reputation for "quick thinking, ferocity and barely bridled ambition".

William Morris Endeavor
On April 27, 2009, WMA and the Endeavor Talent Agency announced that they were forming William Morris Endeavor, or "WME". Endeavor executives Ari Emanuel and Patrick Whitesell were widely seen as the architects of the merger and quickly became the Co-CEOs of WME. Following the official announcement of the merger, nearly 100 WMA employees and former board members were let go. One of those leaving was Jim Wiatt, who came to WMA in 1999 from International Creative Management, where he was vice-chairman. He had joined WMA as president and co-chief executive officers, and had risen to board chairman. Following the merger, WME moved its headquarters into the offices of Endeavor at 9601 Wilshire Boulevard in the heart of Beverly Hills.

In 2011, Emanuel was quoted in a Financial Times profile about the company saying, "We built a culture where people are rewarded for taking risks." Emanuel and Whitesell implemented several leadership strategies to boost the productivity of their agents, most notably, the "Farmhouse" training program.

Expansion
Endeavor grew to include several subsidiary companies and expanded divisions. Fortune named co-CEOs Ari Emanuel and Patrick Whitesell to their 2010 "Businessperson of the Year" list, acknowledging their corporate growth strategies. Emanuel had previously been recognized as a 21st-century "super agent" by both The Wall Street Journal and The Guardian, as well as an Advertising Age "Influencer."

In July 2011, the company and its foundation created Camp Summer Eagle, which provides donations and activities for schoolchildren at Foster Elementary in Compton, California.

Shortly after the merger, WME helped launch the investment group Raine, which aligned the company with properties like Vice Media and Zumba Fitness. In 2010, WME partnered with RED Interactive, a digital advertising agency. Two years later, they formed an alliance with the social media management firm TheAudience, partnering with digital entrepreneur Sean Parker and executing social campaigns for properties like the Seth MacFarlane motion picture Ted and the Coachella Music Festival. 2013 brought a strategic partnership between WME and creative music agency Jingle Punks, which creates, publishes and licenses music. WME is also an investor in the e-commerce platform [OpenSky], which was named one of America's "Most Promising Companies" by Forbes. In 2013, Whitesell and Emanuel were profiled in Fast Company, highlighting the company's digital growth.

On May 2, 2012, WME and Silver Lake Partners, a technology-focused private equity firm based in Silicon Valley, signed an agreement for Silver Lake to acquire a 31.25% minority stake in the agency for $250 million.  A new executive committee, consisting of Co-CEOs Ari Emanuel and Patrick Whitesell and Silver Lake Managing Director Egon Durban, leads the company's growth strategy and investment activities. In July 2013, WME acquired a minority stake in the creative agency Droga5. The partnership combines the companies’ advertising and entertainment resources.

WME-IMG
On December 18, 2013, WME and Silver Lake announced the acquisition of IMG for $2.4 billion. WME’s Ari Emanuel and Patrick Whitesell took over as co-CEOs. On January 21, 2015, it was announced that WME had acquired Global eSports Management (GEM), an international agency representing various esports and professional video game players and personalities. In April 2015, they bought the Professional Bull Riders. On September 23, 2015, it was announced that WME/IMG would be partnering with Turner Broadcasting to create a televised esports league, the ELeague.

On September 14, 2015, WME acquired from Donald Trump the Miss Universe Organization, which produces the Miss Universe, Miss USA and Miss Teen USA beauty pageants and related content. The organization sells television rights to the pageants in other countries. Financial details were not disclosed.

Softbank and Fidelity Investments in early 2016 invested in WME-IMG. The company formed a joint venture in June 2016 for China with Sequoia Capital, Tencent and Fountainvest Partners.

On July 9, 2016, Zuffa, LLC, the parent company of Ultimate Fighting Championship, was sold to a group led by WME-IMG, its owner Silver Lake Partners, Kohlberg Kravis Roberts, and MSD Capital, for $4.025 billion, the largest-ever acquisition in the sports industry. On August 22, 2016, WME acquired the literary agency Rabineau Wachter Sanford & Gillett (RWSG); its co-founders, Sylvie Rabineau and Jill Holwager Gillett, head a division of WME involved in the coordination of screen adaptations of literature. WME/IMG purchased in August 2017 a majority stake in Bloom, a film finance and sales company led by Ken Kao and Alex Walton.

Endeavor
WME-IMG reorganized in October 2017 with the parent company being renamed from WME-IMG to Endeavor. Ari Emanuel became Endeavor CEO and Patrick Whitesell became Endeavor executive chairman. The general talent agency retained the WME name as the sports agency retained the IMG name.

In October 2017, Endeavor Content was formed from the WME's and IMG's film financing and scripted TV sales units, WME's advisory group for film financiers and content producers and Bloom, which will continue to operate autonomously. Appointed as co-presidents of Endeavor Content were Graham Taylor and Chris Rice with additional hires of Negeen Yazdi as senior vice president of film and Joe Hipps as senior vice president of television.

 On November 15, 2017, actor Terry Crews stated on Good Morning America that Adam Venit, head of WME's motion picture department, had squeezed Crews' genitals with his hand at an industry party in February 2016. WME responded they had suspended Venit following an internal investigation, on November 27, 2017, it was announced Venit would return to work after a month's unpaid leave. On December 4, 2017, lawyers acting on behalf of Terry Crews filed suit against WME and Venit stating "It is now time to hold Venit accountable for his sexual predatory behavior and to hold WME accountable for its conduct in condoning, ratifying, and encouraging Venit's sexual predatory behavior".

Third Coast Content, a faith and family audiences production and publishing company, was founded in February 2018 by veteran film executive Ben Howard as CEO with Endeavor Content as an investor and as its provider of sales and advisory services. In April 2019, Droga5 was acquired by Accenture.

Initial public offering 
On May 24, 2019, Endeavor filed forms for an initial public offering (IPO) with the Securities and Exchange Commission (SEC) that would have valued the company at $7.6 billion. The form detailed Endeavor's revenue was $3.61 billion in 2018 with a net income of $100.1 million after adjustments, and potential risks involved of being potentially sued “over alleged long-term neurocognitive impairment arising from concussions”, "collective bargaining to unionize the MMA athletes", and "five related class-action lawsuits filed against it alleging that UFC violated Section 2 of the Sherman Antitrust Act of 1890 by monopolizing the alleged market for elite professional MMA athletes' services". Also included in the filing was the statement that subsidiary WME Dragon Holdings LLC, which bought 49 percent of advertising agency Droga5 in 2013, agreed to sell its interest in Droga5 to Accenture Interactive for $233 million.

On September 26, 2019, a day before it planned to go public, Endeavor Group announced that the IPO had been postponed in order to "evaluate the timing for the proposed offering as market conditions develop." Contributing factors were reported to be the under-performance of the recent IPO for Peloton, and an ongoing lawsuit with several former UFC fighters.

On March 30, 2021, Endeavor Group announced a new planned IPO for later in 2021, with Elon Musk and Fawn Weaver nominated to join its board of directors. On April 28, 2021, Endeavor Group went public on the New York Stock Exchange. Endeavor subsequently used some of the proceeds from the IPO to buy out Zuffa's other shareholders at a value of $1.7 billion, making Zuffa a wholly-owned subsidiary of Endeavor. On July 19, 2021, Ursula Burns joined the board of directors. On September 27, 2021, Endeavor announced that it would acquire OpenBet for $1.2 billion in cash and stock. In March 2022, Musk resigned from the board.

Divestment of Endeavor Content
In 2019, the Writers Guild of America (WGA) filed a lawsuit against the four major Hollywood talent agencies, including WME, Creative Artists Agency (CAA), United Talent Agency (UTA) and ICM Partners, over their usage of packaging deals (under which a talent agency offers a production utilizing its represented writers, directors, and/or actors as a "package" to prospective studios), which the WGA asserted to be an illegal conflict of interest under state and federal law.

As part of agreements that would allow them to resume representing writers, the WGA called for talent agencies to reduce their interest in co-owned production companies, as they considered talent agencies owning their own production companies to also be a conflict of interest. In February 2021, Endeavor agreed to a new franchising deal with the WGA, under which it must cease the use of packaging deals, and not hold more than a 20% stake in production companies affiliated with the agency, thus necessitating that it divest at least 80% of Endeavor Content.

On June 8, 2021, Endeavor began to seek a partner for the division in compliance with the agreement, with the whole sales team returning to the company to start the process. On October 28, 2021, Endeavor started to solicit second-round bids for more than $750 million, with three equity firms and two strategic companies among those in the running. On November 19, 2021, South Korean conglomerate CJ ENM reached a deal to acquire the stake for $775 million. The acquisition primarily covers the company's scripted business, with Endeavor retaining its non-scripted, documentary, and film consulting businesses. The sale is CJ ENM's largest acquisition to-date. The $785 million purchase was completed in January 2022. In September 2022, the company was renamed to Fifth Season; the name stems from Eastern medicine, which recognizes the so-called "fifth season" as a celebratory time of harvest in late summer, thus representing the company's focus on global ideas and content.

On October 26, 2022, JKN Global Group acquired Miss Universe Organization (MUO) from Endeavor for $14 million.

On March 7, 2023, Endeavor acquired unscripted production company Asylum Entertainment Group.

Holdings
Endeavor (June 2016) Chinese subsidiary formed with the investments from Sequoia Capital, Tencent and FountainVest
Fifth Season (formerly Endeavor Content; October 2017–September 2022) film financing and scripted TV sales
Bloom (August 2017) majority stake, a film finance and sales company
160 over 90 (January 2018)
Third Coast Content (February 2018) investment
Frieze, the fine arts and media company
Wonderful Union (August 2018) 
On Location Experiences (January 2020) majority stake, a hospitality and live events company
Asylum Entertainment Group (March 2023) majority stake

Talent agencies

 WME, the talent agency
 Dixon Talent, late-night luminaries and other hosts
 IMG, a sports, fashion and entertainment management company
 Learfield, an intercollegiate sports marketing company
 IMG Academy, a preparatory boarding school and sports training destination
 The Wall Group, stylists and designers

Sports organizations

 Diamond Baseball Holdings, owns nine Minor League Baseball teams as of December 2021
 UFC, mixed martial arts
Professional Bull Riders
Euroleague Basketball, a joint venture between IMG and the European hoops company
ELeague, an eSports joint venture with Turner

References

Further reading

External links
 
 WME Foundation Website
 WME Speakers Website

2009 establishments in California
American companies established in 2009
Holding companies established in 2009
Entertainment companies established in 2009
Companies based in Beverly Hills, California
Entertainment companies based in California
Film production companies of the United States
Holding companies of the United States
Talent and literary agencies
Silver Lake (investment firm) companies
Ultimate Fighting Championship
2021 initial public offerings
Companies listed on the New York Stock Exchange